Arganil is a town and a parish in Arganil Municipality, Portugal. The population in 2011 was 12,145, in an area of 34.11 km².

References

Towns in Portugal
Freguesias of Arganil